Park Gun-woo (born Park Gun-tae on February 5, 1996) is a South Korean actor. He began his career as a child actor in TV series such as I'm Sorry, I Love You (2004), Time Between Dog and Wolf (2007) and East of Eden (2008). The teenage actor has more recently been seen in Warrior Baek Dong-soo (2011) and May Queen (2012).

Filmography

Television series

Film

Music video

Theater

Awards

References

External links
 
 
 Park Gun-woo at Cabin 74
 Park Gun-woo Fan Cafe at Daum
 
 
 

1996 births
South Korean male child actors
South Korean male television actors
South Korean male film actors
Living people
21st-century South Korean male actors
Chung-Ang University alumni